USS Tunxis is a name used more than once by the United States Navy:

 , an American Civil War monitor.
 , a World War II net laying ship.

References 

United States Navy ship names